The 1951 Penn State Nittany Lions football team represented the Pennsylvania State University in the 1951 college football season. The team was coached by Rip Engle and played its home games in New Beaver Field in State College, Pennsylvania.

Schedule

References

Penn State
Penn State Nittany Lions football seasons
Penn State Nittany Lions football